Gulzar in conversation with Tagore is a 2016 album of Tagore's 6 poems and 1 song translated into Hindi by Gulzar with music by Shantanu Moitra and sung by Shaan (singer) and Shreya Ghoshal.

Track listing

References

Hindi-language albums
2016 albums
Adaptations of works by Rabindranath Tagore
Gulzar